Peter de Alcobasse (died 1427) was a Canon of Windsor from 1422 to 1427 and Physician.

Career

He was appointed:
Prebendary of Hoxton in St Paul's 
Physician to the King.

He was appointed to the eighth stall in St George's Chapel, Windsor Castle in 1422 and held the canonry until 1427.

Notes 

1427 deaths
Canons of Windsor
15th-century English medical doctors
Year of birth unknown